The 1949 football season was São Paulo's 20th season since the club's founding in 1930.

Overall

{|class="wikitable"
|-
|Games played || 44 (22 Campeonato Paulista, 22 Friendly match)
|-
|Games won || 30 (16 Campeonato Paulista, 14 Friendly match)
|-
|Games drawn || 6 (4 Campeonato Paulista, 2 Friendly match)
|-
|Games lost ||  8 (2 Campeonato Paulista, 6 Friendly match)
|-
|Goals scored || 129
|-
|Goals conceded || 54
|-
|Goal difference || +75
|-
|Best result || 8–0 (A) v São Paulo (Araçatuba) - Friendly match - 1949.02.13
|-
|Worst result || 0–3 (A) v Prudentina - Friendly match - 1949.05.08
|-
|Most appearances || 
|-
|Top scorer || 
|-

Friendlies

Official competitions

Campeonato Paulista

Record

External links
official website 

Association football clubs 1949 season
1949
1949 in Brazilian football